David Novak (born 1941) is an American theologian and philosopher.

David Novak may also refer to:
David C. Novak (born 1952), American businessman and philanthropist
David J. Novak (born 1961), American judge
David Novák (born 1979), Czech footballer
Dávid Novák, 18th-century Hungarian poet
David Novak, singer and guitarist of the Australian rock duo Polish Club